Trapania melaina is a species of sea slug, a dorid nudibranch, a marine gastropod mollusc in the family Goniodorididae.

Distribution
This species was first described from Sodwana Bay, South Africa.

Description
This goniodorid nudibranch is black in colour with a fine speckling of cream spots. The oral tentacles, lateral papillae, tail and rhinophores are tipped with orange and the gills are translucent with small yellow and black spots.

Ecology
Trapania melaina probably feeds on Entoprocta which often grow on sponges and other living substrata.

References

Goniodorididae
Gastropods described in 2008